Luteri (also Romanized as Lūterī) is a village in Jabal Rural District, Kuhpayeh District, Isfahan County, Isfahan Province, Iran. At the 2006 census, its population was 17, in 11 families.

References 

Populated places in Isfahan County